Getaround is an online car sharing or peer-to-peer carsharing service that connects drivers who need to reserve cars with car owners who share their cars in exchange for payment.

As of 2019, the company was reported to have five million users and approximately 20,000 connected cars worldwide.

Getaround launched to the public on May 24, 2011 at the TechCrunch Disrupt conference. The company operates in Boston, Chicago, San Francisco Bay Area, New Jersey, Portland, Seattle, Philadelphia, Miami, Atlanta, San Diego, Los Angeles, Denver, and Washington D.C.

History
Getaround was founded in 2009 by Sam Zaid, Jessica Scorpio, and Elliot Kroo. In May 2011, Getaround won the TechCrunch Disrupt New York competition.  In 2012, Getaround began serving Portland, Oregon with the aid of a $1.725 million grant from the Federal Highway Administration.

In November 2016, Getaround reached an agreement with City CarShare to take over its fleet, parking spaces and member base.

In August 2018, Getaround raised $300 million in fundings from Softbank.

In April 2019, Getaround absorbed the carsharing platform Drivy for $300 million  and rebranded as Getaround six months later.

In May 2022, Getaround announced their agreement to a Special Purpose Acquisition Company (SPAC) Merger. The deal sees the organisation to be start selling shares of the organisation on the New York Stock. Listed as ‘GETR’ on the exchange the organisation will see a combined company equity value of $1.2 billion.

Financial difficulties
In January 2020, The Information reported the company plans to lay off approximately 150 staff members or about twenty-five percent of the workforce.
Bloomberg reported in March 2020 that demand had dropped due to the COVID-19 pandemic, and that the company was short on cash and looking for a buyer.

Criminal use

Criminals have used Getaround, along with other peer-to-peer car rental services such as Turo, for illegal activities. In February 2020, the Washington Post reported that thieves were finding available cars using the Getaround mobile app, which displayed the exact locations of vehicles for rent. Victims have reported that thieves could break into a car, destroy the Getaround Connect device that is intended to immobilize the car and report its position, and take the keys that had been locked inside the vehicle. Of the 787 cars stolen in the District of Columbia between October 1, 2019 and February 4, 2020, the Metropolitan Police Department of the District of Columbia estimated that 49 of the thefts involved car rental apps such as Getaround. In July 2021, the Attorney General for the District of Columbia announced a settlement with Getaround that required Getaround to pay the district $950,000, to pay restitution to users whose vehicles had been damaged or stolen, and to make other changes to its platform.

In February 2020, NBC News interviewed eight Getaround users whose cars had been stolen, damaged, seized by police as evidence, or otherwise misused. Many of the owners were not fully compensated by Getaround's insurance for their losses. A former Getaround employee told NBC News that the company has known since 2017 that its GPS tracking devices were not tamper-proof.

References 

Carsharing
Companies based in San Francisco
Peer-to-peer
Online marketplaces of the United States
2009 establishments in California
Softbank portfolio companies